Gawler Racecourse railway station is located on the Gawler line.

History

This station was built in 1913.

The station is not in regular use, and only opens when horse-racing events are held at Gawler Racecourse.

Services by platform

References

External links

Railway stations in Adelaide
Railway stations in Australia opened in 1913